Methiopropamine (MPA) is a thiophene ring-based structural analog of methamphetamine originally reported in 1942. Chemically it is not a phenethylamine or amphetamine and is not their functional analog either. It originally appeared for public sale in the UK in December 2010 as a "research chemical" or "legal high", recently branded as Blow. It has limited popularity as a recreational stimulant.

Pharmacology
Methiopropamine functions as a selective norepinephrine-dopamine reuptake inhibitor that is approximately 1.85 times more selective for norepinephrine than dopamine. It is approximately one third as potent as dextroamphetamine as a norepinephrine reuptake inhibitor and one fifth as much as a dopamine reuptake inhibitor. It displays negligible activity as a serotonin reuptake inhibitor.

Methiopropamine has the potential for significant acute toxicity with cardiovascular, gastrointestinal, and psychotic symptoms.

Metabolism

For N-alkyl amphetamines, deamination and N-dealkylation are the major elimination pathways and renal excretion is a minor one.
Methiopropamine is metabolized into active thiopropamine, 4-hydroxymethiopropamine and thiophene S-oxides. These N-demethylated metabolites are further deaminated by the cytochrome P450 enzyme CYP2C19 in the liver transforming them into inactive 1-(thiophen-2-yl)-2-propan-2-one which can be seen as a phenylacetone derivative.

Thiophene-2-carboxylic acid is the final major metabolic product. It is very hydrophilic and is excreted in urine. Methiopropamine and especially thiopropamine are also excreted renally, unchanged.

Synthesis
There is a four-step synthesis of methiopropamine. It begins with (thiophen-2-yl)magnesium bromide, which is reacted with propylene oxide, yielding 1-(thiophen-2-yl)-2-hydroxypropane which is reacted with phosphorus tribromide, yielding 1-(thiophen-2-yl)-2-bromopropane which is finally reacted with methylamine, yielding 1-(thiophen-2-yl)-2-methylaminopropane.

Legal status

China
As of October 2015 MPA is a controlled substance in China.

Finland
Methiopropamine is illegal in Finland.

Germany
Methiopropamine is explicitly illegal in Germany.

United Kingdom
Following the ban on ethylphenidate, authorities noticed an increase in methiopropamine use by injecting users. The ACMD suggested it be banned on 18 November 2015 as it had similar effects to ethylphenidate. The government enacted a temporary drug control order a week later which came into force on 27 November 2015. Though ordinarily the TCDO would only last 1 year, the ACMD reported that since its invocation prevalence of MPA had significantly decreased, and that it had been challenging to collect information about the drug. As a result of this, they requested that the TCDO be extended a further year. 

Methiopropanine was made a Class B controlled drug under the Misuse of Drugs Act 1971 (as amended) (Amendment)(No.2) Order 2017 [SI 2017/1114], this came into effect on the 27th of November 2017.

United States
Methiopropamine is scheduled at the federal level in the United States.  The DEA had planned to place methiopropamine in Schedule I of Controlled Substances and was  accepting public comments until October 4, 2021. Later, the compound was placed in Schedule I.

Florida
Methiopropamine is a Schedule I controlled substance in the state of Florida making it illegal to buy, sell, or possess in Florida.

Tasmania (Australia)

Methiopropamine is a "controlled substance" and therefore an "illegal drug" to import, possess or sell/traffic in without express authority of the relevant government agency.

See also 
 5-MMPA
 α-Pyrrolidinopentiothiophenone (α-PVT)
 Thiopropamine, demethylated counterpart
 Propylhexedrine, another ring substituted stimulant used as over-the-counter decongestant
 Thiothinone

References 

Amines
Stimulants
Thiophenes
Designer drugs
Norepinephrine–dopamine reuptake inhibitors